The Bracklinn Falls are a series of waterfalls north-east of Callander, Scotland on the course of the Keltie Water, where the river crosses the Highland Boundary Fault.

Over recent years there have been a number of tragic incidents at the falls.

Toponymy 
The name of the falls should mean speckled or white foaming pool.

The bridge 
In 2004, a long-standing steel footbridge over the falls was washed away by severe floods. In October 2010, a new, 20-tonne wood-and-copper footbridge, spanning 20m across a very deep gorge, was hauled into place by hand because the location made it impossible to use a crane. In July 2011, this new bridge won an award at the International Footbridge Awards.

In popular culture 
The falls were seen in the 1975 British comedy film, Monty Python and the Holy Grail.

Access to the falls 
The falls can be reached with an easy walk from a car-park close to Callander; the itinerary is signposted and takes a couple of hours there and back.

Nature conservation 
The waterfall and its surrounding area belongs to the Loch Lomond and The Trossachs National Park.

Photo gallery

See also
Waterfalls of Scotland

References

Highland Boundary Fault
Waterfalls of Stirling (council area)